Leo Schulz (March 28, 1865 – August 12, 1944) was a German-born American cellist.

Biography
Schulz was born in Posen, then in Germany, where he initially received his music education before attending the Royal Academic High School of Music in Berlin. He was a principal cellist in Berlin as well as in the Gewandhaus Orchestra of Leipzig from 1886 to 1889. 

After moving to the United States in 1889, Schulz became professor of the New England Conservatory until 1898. He soloist with the Boston Symphony Orchestra. He was first cellist for the New York Philharmonic Society from 1890 to 1906 (Reader note: 1906 is not correct; he remained in this position in the 1920s or later), and president of the New York Tonkünstler. In 1905 he taught at the National Conservatory of Music of America in New York. In the 1920s, with other musicians, he founded the Old Masters Trio. 

He was a professor at Yale University for a time.

Publications
 Cello Album, Vol. 1
 Cello Album, Vol. 2
 Cello Classics, Vol. 1
 Cello Classics, Vol. 2
 Cello Compositions, Vol. 1
 Cello Compositions, Vol. 2
He also wrote many cello compositions, songs, orchestral overtures, and cantatas; these remained unpublished, however.

Personal life
On April 12, 1885, he married Ida Bartsch in Berlin.

Notes

References
 
 
 
 
 

1865 births
1944 deaths
American cellists
American male composers
American composers
Yale University faculty
New England Conservatory faculty
German emigrants to the United States